Verkh-Rechka is a rural locality (a village) in Zabolotskoye Rural Settlement, Permsky District, Perm Krai, Russia. The population was 16 as of 2010. There are 3 streets.

Geography 
Verkh-Rechka is located 62 km southwest of Perm (the district's administrative centre) by road. Novoilyinskoye is the nearest rural locality.

References 

Rural localities in Permsky District